Barringha is a locality in the City of Townsville, Queensland, Australia.

History 
The locality was named and bounded on 27 July 1991.

References 

City of Townsville
Localities in Queensland